Ornativalva ochraceofusca is a moth of the family Gelechiidae. It was described by Sattler in 1967. It is found in Turkey and Afghanistan.

Adults have been recorded on wing in June, July and August.

The host plant is unknown, but might be a Tamarix species.

References

Moths described in 1967
Ornativalva